The 120 members of the first Knesset were elected on 25 January 1949. The breakdown by party was as follows:
Mapai: 46
Mapam: 19 (gained one member during the Knesset term)
United Religious Front: 16
Herut: 14 (lost two members during the Knesset term)
General Zionists: 7
Progressive Party: 5
Sephardim and Oriental Communities: 4
Maki: 4 (lost one member during the Knesset term)
Democratic List of Nazareth: 2
Fighters' List: 1
WIZO: 1
Yemenite Association: 1

Members of the Knesset

Replacements

See also
Knesset
List of Knesset speakers
List of political parties in Israel
List of Israelis
List of Likud Knesset Members
Prime Minister of Israel
President of Israel
Politics of Israel

External links
 Members of the First Knesset Knesset website

 
01